This was the first edition of the tournament. The tournament was originally scheduled to be played in Villa Allende but was relocated to Buenos Aires due to operational issues at the venue in Villa Allende.

Arklon and Conner Huertas del Pino won the title after defeating Matías Franco Descotte and Alejo Lorenzo Lingua Lavallén 7–5, 4–6, [11–9] in the final.

Seeds

Draw

References

External links
 Main draw

Challenger Tenis Club Argentino - Doubles